Brackenfield is a civil parish in the North East Derbyshire district of Derbyshire, England.  The parish contains 15 listed buildings that are recorded in the National Heritage List for England.  Of these, one is listed at Grade II*, the middle of the three grades, and the others are at Grade II, the lowest grade.  The parish contains the village of Brackenfield and the surrounding area.  The most important building in the parish is Ogston Hall, a country house, that is listed together with associated structures.  The other listed buildings are farmhouses and farm buildings, a church and its lychgate, a ruined chapel, a public house, a wall containing a gravestone and a guidepost, and a railway bridge.


Key

Buildings

References

Citations

Sources

 

Lists of listed buildings in Derbyshire